Rufino "Rufo" Familiar Sánchez (born 27 December 1986) is a Spanish professional footballer who plays for Pontevedra CF as a forward.

Club career
Born in Madrid, Rufo represented CD Coslada and CF Rayo Majadahonda as a youth, and made his senior debut with the latter's reserves during the 2005–06 season, in the regional leagues. He subsequently represented, all in his native region, CD San Fernando de Henares, AD Torrejón CF, Internacional de Madrid (two stints) and CA Pinto, all in Tercera División; his best input in the country consisted of 30 goals during the 2009–10 campaign, while in representation of the second latter club.

In 2012, after impressing in a friendly match, Rufo joined Stallion FC of Philippines' United Football League. He moved to fellow league team Global FC in July 2013, but his transfer was blocked by Stallion after his contract was disputed by his previous club. He moved back to Internacional in November 2013,

On 14 January 2014, Rufo switched teams and countries again after agreeing to a contract with Thai Premier League club PTT Rayong FC. He made his debut for the club on 23 February, netting the opener in a 1–1 away draw against Singhtarua FC.

Ahead of the 2015 season, Rufo moved to Songkhla United FC. On 18 January 2017, he returned to Spain and signed for Atlético Sanluqueño CF in Segunda División B.

Rufo returned to Global Cebu on 1 August 2017, but left the Philippines Football League club in May 2018. In August, he returned to Internacional, with the club now in the third division.

In January 2020, Rufo moved to Pontevedra CF.

Honours

Club
Stallion
United Football League: 2013
UFL Cup: 2012

Individual
United Football League Golden Boot: 2013 (18 goals)
United Football League Golden Ball: 2013

References

External links

1986 births
Living people
Footballers from Madrid
Spanish footballers
Association football forwards
Segunda División B players
Tercera División players
Rufo Sanchez
CF Rayo Majadahonda players
CD San Fernando de Henares players
Atlético Sanluqueño CF players
Global Makati F.C. players
Stallion Laguna F.C. players
Internacional de Madrid players
Pontevedra CF footballers
Spanish expatriates in the Philippines
Spanish expatriate sportspeople in Thailand
Expatriate footballers in the Philippines
Expatriate footballers in Thailand